Gandoman (also Romanized as Gandomān; also known as Qal‘eh Ganduman and Qal‘eh-ye Gandomān (Persian: قَلعِۀ گَندُمان), both meaning "Fort Gandoman") is a city and capital of Gandoman District, in Borujen County, Chaharmahal and Bakhtiari Province, Iran. At the 2006 census, its population was 5,578 in 1,388 households. The following census in 2011 counted 5,761 people in 1,576 households. The latest census in 2016 showed a population of 6,291 people in 1,852 households. The city is populated by Lurs.

References 

Borujen County

Cities in Chaharmahal and Bakhtiari Province

Populated places in Chaharmahal and Bakhtiari Province

Populated places in Borujen County

Luri settlements in Chaharmahal and Bakhtiari Province